Tom Mullen may refer to:

Tom Mullen (American football) (born 1951), American football offensive lineman
Tom Mullen (Australian footballer) (1868–1942), Australian rules footballer

See also
Tom Mullens (1900–1961), Australian rules footballer
Thomas Mullen (1896–1966), Irish politician
Thomas Mullen (author) (born 1974), American novelist